Peter Brooke may refer to:
Peter Brooke, Baron Brooke of Sutton Mandeville (born 1934), British politician
Peter Brooke (17th-century MP) (1602–1685), English politician

See also
Peter Brook (1925–2022), English theatre and film director
Peter Brook (painter) (1927–2009), English painter
Peter Brooks (disambiguation)